Guazzelli is a surname. Notable people with this name include:
Élisabeth Guazzelli (born 1955), French physicist
 (1922–1994), Brazilian politician
 (1954–2009), French gangster
 (1934–1992), Italian carabinieri marshal, killed by mafia
 (1930–2001), Brazilian politician, governor of Rio Grande do Sul and minister of agriculture
Victor Guazzelli (1920–2004), British Catholic bishop